Noatak is a census-designated place (CDP) in the Northwest Arctic Borough in the U.S. state of Alaska. The population was 570 at the 2020 census, up from 514 in 2010. It is served by Noatak Airport.

History 

Noatak was established as a fishing and hunting camp in the 1800s. Two identifiable groups of Inupiat resided on the Noatak River. By the early 20th century,  the missionaries Robert and Carrie Samms settled in what they called "Noatak". A United States post office was established in 1940.

Geography
Noatak is located at  (67.572031, -162.975085).

Noatak village lies near the western boundary of the 6.6-million acre (270,000 km2) Noatak National Preserve and is the only settlement on the over- long Noatak River.

Demographics

Noatak first appeared on the 1880 U.S. Census as an unincorporated Inuit village of "Noatagamute." All 400 of its residents were Inuit. It did not return again until 1910, this time as Noatak. It has returned on every successive census to date. It was made a census-designated place (CDP) in 1980.

As of the census of 2000, there were 428 people, 100 households, and 90 families residing in the CDP. There were 106 housing units at an average density of 9.2/sq mi (3.5/km2). The racial makeup of the CDP was 3.74% White, 0.23% Black or African American, 93.69% Native American, and 2.34% from two or more races.  0.23% of the population were Hispanic or Latino of any race.

There were 100 households, out of which 69.0% had children under the age of 18 living with them, 56.0% were married couples living together, 22.0% had a female householder with no husband present, and 10.0% were non-families. 9.0% of all households were made up of individuals, and none had someone living alone who was 65 years of age or older.  The average household size was 4.28 and the average family size was 4.51.

In the CDP, the population was spread out, with 42.5% under the age of 18, 10.5% from 18 to 24, 28.7% from 25 to 44, 12.9% from 45 to 64, and 5.4% who were 65 years of age or older.  The median age was 23 years. For every 100 females, there were 104.8 males.  For every 100 females age 18 and over, there were 108.5 males.

The median income for a household in the CDP was $30,833, and the median income for a family was $31,667. Males had a median income of $25,833 versus $21,250 for females. The per capita income for the CDP was $9,659.  About 25.0% of families and 22.0% of the population were below the poverty line, including 21.9% of those under age 18 and 13.6% of those age 65 or over.

Transportation
Noatak has a  gravel public airstrip and is primarily reached by air. No road goes to Noatak. Snowmobiles, ATV's, and small boats are important means of inter-village travel and for local subsistence activities.

Facilities
The Napaaqtugmiut School, operated by the Northwest Arctic Borough School District, serves the community. Its current building opened in 2008.  it had 177 students, with Alaska Natives making up 95% of the student body.

See also
Noatak Wilderness

References

External links
Subsistence wildlife harvests in five northwest Alaska communities, 2001-2003 : results of a household survey / by Kawerak, Inc., Maniilaq Association, and the Alaska Department of Fish and Game ; by Susan Georgette ... [et al.]. Hosted by Alaska State Publications Program.

Census-designated places in Alaska
Census-designated places in Northwest Arctic Borough, Alaska
Chukchi Sea
Populated places of the Arctic United States